There were two Scottish League Cup finals played in 2016:
2016 Scottish League Cup final (March), Ross County 2–1 Hibernian
2016 Scottish League Cup final (November), Celtic 3–0 Aberdeen